Nasi kandar is a popular northern Malaysian dish from Penang, originally introduced by Tamil Muslim traders from India. The meal consists of steamed rice combined with an array of distinct curries, sides dishes, and gravies. The selection of curries consists of various blends of vegetables, seafood or meat. 

Other closely related regional variations of Nasi Kandar include Nasi ganja (Ipoh), Nasi dalca (Penang), Nasi lemak royale/Nasi lemak (Alor Setar) and Nasi maduri (Perlis).

Etymology
The dish name is potentially a portmanteau, Nasi derives from Malay, meaning rice; while Kandha''' is an Urdu name means shoulder; another possible theory is that the name originated from the word Mengandar - "rest on shoulders" in Malay. However, both theories are aligned on its common origin - the use of a shoulder pole for transporting the food.

History

Nasi kandar originates from the early 1900s, when itinerant Indian Muslim vendors would sell curry and rice to the dock employees of Weld Quay, located in George Town, Penang. 

The earliest form of nasi kandar initially contained fish curry with eggplant or okra, fried curry beef, fried fish and boiled eggs; it cost about 5 cents each. The rice hawkers would commonly set up stools at a jetty to sell breakfast to dock workers. By the 1930s, the rice peddlers would also commonly travel from home-to-home. It was also common for the seller to operate on the roadside or beneath a shady tree. They would carry brass pots by a bamboo or a wooden shoulder pole; on one end of the pole there were containers holding curry meals, with plain rice on the other end. 

However by the mid 20th century, the traditional approach of transporting the rice and dishes on the shoulder began to wane off, as many sellers moved towards selling nasi kandar in stalls and alleyways. In the 1970s more vendors invested in the restaurant industry, further departing from the mobile eatery origins of nasi kandar. The menu options have also progressed; a common present-day nasi kandar restaurant will sell up to dozens of distinct curries, gravy and side dishes.

Hameediyah is recognized as Penang's oldest nasi kandar restaurant, having originally started under a tree at a field in Lebuh Campbell, Penang in 1907.

Description

The rice for a nasi kandar dish is often placed in a wooden container about three feet high, giving it a distinctive aroma.  The rice is accompanied by side dishes such as fried chicken, curried beef spleen, cubed beef, lamb, fish roe, fried prawns or fried squid.  The vegetable dish would usually be (brinjal or "terong") (aubergine), okra (lady fingers or "bhindi") or bitter gourd.  A mixture of curry sauces is poured on the rice. This is called 'banjir' (flooding) and imparts a diverse taste to the rice.

Traditionally, nasi kandar is always served with its side dishes on a single plate. Nowadays, small melamine bowls are used for the side dishes. Nevertheless, the curry sauce mix is always poured directly onto the rice.

In recent years, several chain restaurants have appeared such as Nasi Kandar Shaaz, Nasi Kandar Subaidah, Nasi Kandar Nasmir, Pelita Nasi Kandar, Nasi Kandar Astana, Q-Bistro Nasi Kandar and Kayu Nasi Kandar. Purists have disputed its taste compared to the original Penang versions. 

Variations
There are a few related forms of the meal with some divergent on the type of rice, side dishes and recipes; albeit all commonly shared a curry-based condiments to complete the meal:

 Nasi dalca - Plain white rice or the ghee-based Nasi minyak, commonly paired with Kuah Dalca'' (Dalca-styled gravy) and an assortment of curries. Sprinkles of Bawang goreng is usually added on top of the meal.
 Nasi ganja - Yellow coloured rice with herbs, though in fact no "ganja" (cannabis) is actually used in its preparation. Commonly associated with Ipoh, and to some extend Perlis.
 Nasi lemak Alor Setar/Nasi lemak Royale - Slightly different from white basmati-based rice commonly seen in Nasi Kandar, the Nasi Lemak Royale is yellow in colour, some vendors may even added glutinous rice on the recipe. The curry mixture is sometimes being slightly sweet compared to the traditional Nasi Kandar. Popular in Alor Setar, Kedah.
 Nasi maduri - Yellow in colour, and commonly eaten with dalca, meat and chicken curry. Usually found in the state of Perlis.

See also 
 Mamak stall
 Banana leaf rice

References

External links 
 Nasi Kandar
 Nasi Kandar Guide 

Malaysian rice dishes